An uttapam (or uthapam, uttappam, etc.) is a type of dosa from South India. Unlike a typical dosa, which is crisp and crepe-like, an uttapam is thicker, with toppings. The name is derived from the Tamil words appam and utthia or uttria, meaning "poured appam", because appam is cooked in a round-bottom pan, whereas utthia-appam is cooked on a flat skillet. Tamil ancient literature mentions it by name. The classic breakfast of Tamil residents consists of idli, dosas or uttappams mostly accompanied by sambar and chutney.

Preparation
Uttapam batter is made of a 1:3 ratio of urad dal and rice. The rice can be a combination of parboiled rice and a regular variety such as basmati.  The lentils and rice are soaked overnight, ground and fermented until it rises. The batter is spread on a hot pan, generally circular, toppings spread on it and patted gently. Oil is dripped around it, flipped when it is golden-brown, oil dripped again, another flip to make sure the second surface is baked too. The uttapam is then ready to be served and eaten.

Uttapams are traditionally made with toppings such as tomatoes, onion, chillies, capsicum and coriander; other common choices are coconut, grated carrots and beets. They are often eaten with sambar or chutney.

See also
Appam
List of Indian breads
 List of pancakes

References

External links

 Kodo Millet uthappam
 Uttapam Batter Recipe 

Tamil cuisine
Indian breads
Pancakes
South Indian cuisine
Telangana cuisine
Karnataka cuisine
Andhra cuisine
Indian rice dishes
Lentil dishes